Farington is a small village and civil parish in Lancashire, England. 

Farington may also refer to:

 Farington (surname)
 Farington railway station

See also
 Faringdon, Oxfordshire, England
 Farington Moss
 Farringdon (disambiguation)
 Farrington (disambiguation)